Group A of the EuroBasket 2015 took place between 5 and 10 September 2015. The group played all of its games at Park&Suites Arena in Montpellier, France.

The group is composed of Bosnia and Herzegovina, Finland, France, Israel, Poland and Russia. The four best ranked teams advanced to the second round.

Standings

All times are local (UTC+2).

5 September

Poland v Bosnia and Herzegovina

Israel v Russia

France v Finland

6 September

Russia v Poland

Finland v Israel

Bosnia and Herzegovina v France

7 September

Finland v Russia

Israel vs. Bosnia and Herzegovina

France v Poland

9 September

Bosnia and Herzegovina v Finland

Poland v Israel

Russia v France

10 September

Finland v Poland

Bosnia and Herzegovina v Russia

Israel vs. France

External links
Official website

Group A
International basketball competitions hosted by France
2015–16 in French basketball
2015–16 in Israeli basketball
2015–16 in Russian basketball
2015–16 in Bosnia and Herzegovina basketball
2015–16 in Finnish basketball
2015–16 in Polish basketball
Sport in Montpellier